Amy Elsie Horrocks (23 February 1867 – 1919) was an English music educator, composer and pianist. She was born to English parents (Francis James Horrocks 8 July 1829 – 27 April 1913) and Hannah Horrocks (née Allen 1833 – 22 April 1913) in Rio Grande do Sul, Brazil, and in 1882 studied piano and composition at the Royal Academy of Music with Adolf Schlösser and Francis William Davenport. She won the Potter Exhibition prize in 1888 and the Bennett Prize in 1889. After completing her studies, she performed as a pianist and taught music in London. There are claims that she was proposed to by Sir Henry Wood, whom she turned down. One of her compositions, Romaunt of the Page, had its premiere at one of the Promenade Concerts on 6 October 1899.

She eventually married Nicholas Paramythioti (1871–1943) a businessman from Corfu, on 22 August 1903, one of many lodgers at the house in Hampstead (17 Goldhurst Terrace)  that the family used to let rooms to.  Around this time she and Nicholas moved to France (where her two children were born, John in 1904 and Pamela in 1906) and she divided her time between France and Margate (where her parents had retired to and where they are both buried, having succumbed to the influenza epidemic, dying within a few days of each other in 1913).

She kept a diary, (which spans the years 1907 to 1918)  which she wrote as a sort of ‘life-guidance manual’ for her two children. These few entries give an insight into her opinions about music and composition.

24 October 1907
“I’m afraid my composing days are practically over. I worked too hard once upon a time, & now I can only do very little without feeling my head spin round. And as regards the opera it really does not matter; these light things are usually written & composed by half a dozen different people; they have no consistency whatever, but nobody minds.”

21 March 1908
“I have been filling up my time with composition I have from past songs in hand; because expenses are heavy & I want to help. I hope neither of my dears will want to take up music as a profession, by the way! Their Mummy should serve them as an awful warning. If you put aside prima donas, infant prodigies, & a very few composers who happen to be momentarily the sage, there is no profession worse paid; & certainly there are very few more injurious to the health.”

23 May 1908
“All those things – hysterical religion, sentimental poetry, sad music – (of which I myself have written far too much!) all, as Ruskin says “waste your strength in artificial sorrow” – that strength which God gave you to bear your real troubles, to control your own nature, & to fight the battle of life.”

Daughter
Her daughter, Pamela described Amy as a committed pacifist and the obituaries in The Stage and The Vote announcing her death both report that "shortly before her death a jury of musicians and literary men in Paris had awarded her the prize, open to the world, for a song in honour of the 'Drapeau Bleu' - the ensign of the League of Nations" (forerunner to the United Nations). The book, 'The Blind Horse of Corfu' a memoir of Amy's daughter, Pamela Morris (née Paramythioti) told to Anne Norrington, refers to Amy's composition "of a 'Song for Peace' which had apparently won an important prize."

Works

Horrocks composed music for orchestra, chamber ensemble, choral and solo voice. Some of her works have been recorded and issued on CD, including:
Catherine Wilmers, Simon Marlow - A Cello Century Of British Women Composers Audio CD (22 August 2000) Quicksilva Records, ASIN: B00004U5FS
Copies of many of her compositions are held at the British Library. Selected works include (dates are dates of publication unless better dates are available):

Amoret. Song, the words by M. Byron, 1898

Another Spring. [Two-part song.] Words by C. Rossetti. Op. 18. No. 5, 1896

April Showers. [Two-part song.] Words by M. C. Gillington ... Op. 23. No. 2, 1895

Ashes of Roses (words by E. Goodall) and a Love Song of the 17th Century (words by Austin Dobson) ... With a Primrose (words by T. Carew ... ) and a Cradle Hymn (words from Kingsley's ♯Waterbabies'). [In 2 keys.], 1890

At Peep of Dawn. [Three-part song.] Words by C. Scollard, 1891

The Baby Child of Mary. Spanish Lullaby, etc., 1914

Berceuse. Op. 4. No. 1. [P. F.], 1890

The Bird and the Rose. Song, words by R. S. Hichens, 1895

The bird and the rose for bass voice and orchestra, 1917

Bitter for sweet. [Two-part song.] Words by C. Rossetti. Op. 18. No. 3, 1895

The Blackbird. Two-Part Song for female voices, with Pianoforte accompaniment, the words by M. C. Gillington, 1905

Bloom, O my Rose. [Two-part song.] Words by W. S. Landor. Op. 18. No. 1, 1894

Blow, blow, thou Winter Wind. [Three-part song.] Words by Shakespeare, 1891

Bonnie wee Thing. Song, words by R. Burns, 1895

Child's Talk in April. [Duet for female voices.] Words by C. Rossetti, 1908

Christmas Carol. Words by J. Milton, 1893

Constant Love. Song, etc., 1890

Cottage Cradle Song. [Two-part song.] Words by M. Byron, 1908

Country Dance, for cello & piano, Op. 17/2

Cradle Song and Scherzo à la Mazurka for violin and piano. Op. 12, 1893

The Cuckoo. [Duet for female voices.] Words by M. C. Gillington, 1905

The Daisy. Two-Part Song for female voices, with Pianoforte accompaniment, the words by Wordsworth, 1900

Dead Hope. [Two-part song.] Words by C. Rossetti, 1913

The Daisy Lullaby. [Two-part song.] Words by M. Byron, 1908

The Dancers. Two-Part Song for female voices, with Pianoforte accompaniment, the words by M. C. Gillington, 1905

A Dirge for the Year. Words by P. B. Shelley, 1893

The Discontented Bunny. Action Song, words by M. C. Gillington, 1911

The Dustman. Song, the words by M. Byron, 1904

Eight Variations on an original Theme for pianoforte, violin, viola and cello. Op. 11, 1893

Elfin Sleep Song [Three- part song], etc., 1899

The Fairy Cobbler. Two-Part Song for female voices, words by M. C. Gillington, 1898

The Fairy Thrall [Four-part song], etc., 1899

Forest Slumber Song. [Duet for female voices.] Words by M. C. Gillington, 1908

A Garden. Words by P. B. Shelley, 1893

Golden Eyes ... [Song.] The Words by A. Lang, 1899

Harebell Curfew. [Duet for female voices.] Words by M. Byron, 1899

Hill-Tops. [Two-part song.] Words by M. C. Gillington ... Op. 23. No. 3, 1895

The Hotspur. Song, the words by M. Byron, 1900

If I had a Court and Castle. Irish Love Song, words by M. C. Gillington, 1913

An Indian Lullaby. Song, words by M. Gillington, etc., 1899

An Indian Lullaby, etc., 1904

Irish Melody and Country Dance for violoncello and piano. Op. 17/1, 1894

July the Pedlar. Vocal Duet. Words by N. Hopper, 1899

Lady Moon. Song, the words by M. Byron, 1900

The Lady of Shalott, - Tennyson - ... with pianoforte accompaniment, 1899

The Lady of Shalott. Tennyson ... With musical accompaniment for Violin, Violoncello and Pianoforte, 1899

Love's Requiem. [Song.] Words by M. C. Gillington. [With violoncello obbligato.], 1894

A Lullaby, words by Mrs. G. Byron, 1895

Mayday Morn. [Duet for female voices.] Words by M. C. Gillington, 1905

A Midsummer Song. Words by M. Gillington. [In C minor and D minor.], 1891

My little House. Song, words by M. Byron, 1914

My Love is a slumb'ring Flower. Song, words by M. C. Gillington, 1913

My Love will ne'er forsake me. Irish Love Song, words by Mrs. G. Byron, 1895

The Night has a Thousand Eyes. Canon, words by F. W. Bourdillon, 1899

The Nightingale. Song. The Words by F. E. Weatherly, 1897

On a Nankin Plate. Song, words by A. Dobson, 1896

On the Pond. [Two-part song.] Words by F. Schloesser. Op. 18. No. 6, 1896

Philomel and the Aloe Flower. [Song.] Words by A. Webster, 1902

Piano Trio in B, 1897

Picture Story Books. Action Song, words by M. C. Gillington, 1911

Prithee, Maiden. Song, words by S. Lever, 1896

Ragged Robin. [Two-part song.] Words by M. Byron, 1897

The Recompense. Song, the words by M. Byron. With Violoncello accompaniment, 1898

The Return of May. Choral Trio for female voices, with Pianoforte accompaniment. Words by Mrs. Hemans, 1886

The Return of May. Choral Trio for female voices, with Pianoforte accompaniment, etc., 1901

The Rigadoon. Song, words by M. Byron. [In D and F.], 1901

Rigaudon for Violin with Pianoforte accompaniment, 1900

A Romany Spring Song. The words by M. Byron, 1896

Rose-Song. Words by P. B. Marston, 1893

Says the Nightingale. [Duet for female voices.] Words by M. C. Gillington, 1905

The Season for Wooing. Song. Words by G. S. Aspinall, 1899

A Serenade. [Three-part song.] Words by H. M. Waithman, 1891

Sing Heigh-ho! Song. The words by C. Kingsley, etc., 1898

Six (Nine) Action Songs. Words and Actions by M. C. Gillington ... No. 1. A Birdie's Plans. No. 2. The Fan Folk. No. 3. The Sleep Fairy. No. 4. Dolly's Distress. No. 5. Impecunious. No. 6. The Beetle and the Dormouse. No. 7. The Flower Circus. No. 8. The Town Mouse and the Country Mouse. No. 9. The Butterfly's Wedding, 1902–04

Six Greek Love Songs, 1899

Six Pieces for piano ... (Op. 14.) No. 1. Boat-Song. No. 2. Minuet. No. 3. Romance. No. 4. Spinning-Song. No. 5. Waltz. No. 6. Mazurka, 1893

Six Songs. Op. 10, 1892

The Skylark's Wooing. [Two-part song.] Words by M. C. Gillington ... Op. 23. No. 1, 1895

Slumber Song of the Year. [Two-part song.] Words by M. Byron, 1897

Sonata for cello and pianoforte, 1889

Sonata in G for Pianoforte and Violoncello. Op. 7, 1896

A Spanish Pastoral. Spanisches Schäferlied. [Song.] Words by M. Byron. Deutsche Uebersetzung von O. L. Sturm. [With flute obbligato.], 1899

A Spring Day. Words by Wordsworth, 1893

Spring in the Forest. Two-Part Song for female voices, with Pianoforte accompaniment, the words by M. Byron, 1899

Summer Changes. Words by P. B. Marston, 1895

A Summer Wish. [Two-part song.] Words by C. Rossetti, 1913

The Sun's the Heart of the Sky. [Song.] Words by A. Webster, 1902

Sweet Dreams. - Cradle Song. - [Duet for female voices.] The words by W. Blake, 1900

The Sweet Spring. [Duet for female voices.] Words by T. Nash, etc., 1904

A Tale of the Sea, and Valse. Two light pieces for the pianoforte, 1915

To Althea, from Prison ... [Song.] English words by R. Lovelace ... Deutsch von W. A. Kastner, 1900

To Music, to becalm his Fever. Words by R. Herrick, 1893

To Violets. Vocal Duet. Words by M. Byron, 1899

Tragedy. Two-Part Song for female voices, the words by M. C. Gillington, etc., 1898

Travellers' Tales. Action Song, words by M. C. Gillington, 1911

Trois Pièces faciles pour violon avec accompagnement de piano. Op. 34. 1. Barcarolle. 2. Élégie. 3. Masjurka, 1900

Twilight, - Rêverie - for Violoncello and Pianoforte ... Taken from ♯Songs for Children', 1901

Two Fairy Songs, for ... treble voices. 1. Elfin Sleep Song. 2. The Fairy Thrall. Words by M. C. Gillington. Op. 13, 1892

Two Lyrics ... No. 1. Forget-me-not ... No. 2. An Idle Poet. Words by H. Robertson, 1903

Undine, Op. 16 for orchestra, Performed at The Proms, 6 February 1897

Waltz. Op. 4. No. 2. [P. F.], 1890

Weep you no more, sad Fountains. [Duet for female voices.] Words anonymous, etc., 1904

When Mortals are at Rest, etc., 1893

The Winds. A Cantata for treble voices, words by M. C. Gillington. Op. 22. (German words by W. Kastner), 1898

4 Songs ... [No. 1.] My Lady Wind. [No. 2.] The Shepherd. [No. 3.] The Babes in the Wood. [No. 4.] The Lamb, 1900

4 Songs ... [No. 1.] The Old Woman and her Broom. [No. 2.] Sleep, Baby, sleep. [No. 3.] Cock Robin's Serenade. [No. 4.] Up in the Morning early, 1900

4 Songs ... Voice Part in Tonic Sol-fa notation, etc., 1901

4 Songs. [No. 1.] The Flowers' Mother. [No. 2.] A Little Spring Song. [No. 3.] Queen Mab. [No. 4.] Adventure. [Words by M. C. Gillington and T. Hood.], 1904

6 Action Songs. The words by M. Gillington ... In Staff and Tonic Sol-fa Notation. [No. 1.] The Marching Host. [No. 2.] The Blue Room. [No. 3.] The Weathercock. [No. 4.] The Flowers' Frocks. [No. 5.] Old Jack Frost. [No. 6.] The Soldier's Return, 1901

Notes

References 

1867 births
1919 deaths
Year of death uncertain
19th-century classical composers
20th-century classical composers
English classical pianists
English women pianists
British music educators
Women classical composers
British classical composers
People from Rio Grande do Sul
Alumni of the Royal Academy of Music
20th-century English composers
19th-century classical pianists
20th-century English women musicians
19th-century British composers
Women music educators
20th-century women composers
19th-century women composers
19th-century English women
19th-century English people
19th-century women pianists
20th-century women pianists